Rachel Carmel Hakim (née Nicolazzo), better known as Rachel Z, is a jazz and rock pianist and keyboardist. She has recorded 10 solo albums as a jazz musician. Her musical style, especially her improvisation, has been described as adjacent to Herbie Hancock and McCoy Tyner".

Career 
In 1988, she co-wrote the Grammy Award-winning and certified Gold Record "Tokyo Blue" with saxophonist Najee. From 1988 to 1996, she played keyboards and piano with fusion band Steps Ahead. In 1995, she worked with Wayne Shorter on his album High Life, which won a Grammy Award for Best Contemporary Jazz Album in 1997.

While signed to Columbia Records by Dr. George Butler, she released Trust the Universe which featured a straight-ahead jazz A-side with Charnett Moffett and Al Foster and an electric jazz B-side with Lenny White and Victor Bailey.

In 199,  she recorded her next solo CD, Room of One's Own – A Tribute to Women Artists. It won four stars in DownBeat and extensive critical acclaim for the original compositions and wind ensemble arrangements.

In 1999, Hakim was a part of a jazz fusion project by Stanley Clarke and Lenny White. The project, entitled Vertú, also featured such artists as Karen Briggs on violin and Richie Kotzen on guitar and resulted in an album of the same name that year. She experimented with her own rock group Peacebox as a vocalist. During this time, she was also working with the Neapolitan pop legend Pino Daniele, with whom she first began working in 1996 and toured with until his death in 2015. She toured with Peter Gabriel during his Growing Up tours from 2002 to 2006, which gave Rachel the opportunity to widen her fan base and work with bassist Tony Levin. Her project, entitled "Dept. of Good and Evil", on Savoy received positive reviews.

In 2010, she formed a new band with her husband Omar Hakim, entitled "The Trio Of OZ" which released its first CD and began touring. They both also launched OZmosis Records in 2010. This group performed internationally with Solomon Dorsey on bass and joined Pino Daniele for La Grande Madre Tour in 2012 while also performing OZ tour dates. In 2013–14, she recorded and toured as additional synth for The Omar Hakim Experience. She played synth with Wayne Escoffery for his US and Euro tour of 2014 release of Live at Firehouse 12. She toured with Terri Lyne Carrington in 2014 for the Mosaictour and recorded on the 2015 release of Mosaic 2 "Love and Soul" on Concords Records. In 2015, she joined Neal Schon Vortex to open for rock band Journey for 17 gigs in Canada.

Hakim and her husband formed the OZExperience, now "Ozmosys" (Omar and Rachel Z), and in 2019, the new group recorded an EP Eyes to the Future Vol.1 at Power Station. The five-track EP was released on November 4, 2019 with Kurt Rosenwinkel on guitar and Linley Marthe on bass, with J. C. Maillard on additional guitar and voice. The band was hailed at the opening night of the 2019 London Jazz Festival in Jazzwise:

Personal life
Hakim is married to Omar Hakim, an American jazz drummer. A graduate of the New England Conservatory of Music, she has been a professor at the College for the Performing Arts at The New School University (jazz and contemporary music studies) since 2000.
She is a visiting artist at the Berklee Electronic Production and Design Department since 2018 intermittently.
She attended SUNY Purchase in 2019–2021 and earned a master's degree in Studio Composition with recognition of “Outstanding Student Award” in Studio Composition and Electronic Music.

Discography

As leader
 Trust the Universe (Columbia, 1993)
 A Room of One's Own (NYC, 1996)
 Love Is the Power (GRP, 1998)
 On the Milkyway Express (Tone Center, 2000)
 Moon at the Window (Tone Center, 2002)
 First Time Ever I Saw Your Face (Venus, 2003)
 Everlasting (Tone Center, 2004)
 Grace (Chesky, 2005)
 Mortal (ArtistShare, 2006) 
 Dept of Good and Evil (Savoy/WEA, 2007)
 I Will Possess Your Heart (Pony Canyon, 2009)

As a member 
 Steps Ahead, Yin Yang (NYC, 1990)
 Vertú, Vertú (Sony, 1999)
 The Trio of OZ, The Trio of OZ (OZmosis, 2010)
 The Omar Hakim Experience, We are One (OZmosis, 2014)
 OZmosys, Eyes To The Future, Vol. 1 EP (OZmosis, 2019)

As guest
With Pino Daniele
 Medina  (Sony, 2001)
 Pino Daniele, Francesco De Gregori, Fiorella Mannoia, Ron - In Tour (Sony, 2002)
 Concerto: Medina Live (Sony, 2002)
 Electric Jam (Sony, 2009)
 Boogie Boogie Man (Sony, 2010)
 La Grande Madre (Blue Drag/Sony, 2012)

With Al Di Meola
 Kiss My Axe (Tomato, 1991)
 The Infinite Desire (Universal, 1998)With Peter Gabriel
 Hit (Real World, 2003)
 Growing Up Live Tour (Real World, 2004)
 Still Growing Up Live & Unwrapped (Real World, 2005)

With others
 Bobby Watson – Urban Renewal (Kokopelli, 1995)
 Regina Carter – Regina Carter (Atlantic Jazz, 1995)
 Wayne Shorter – Highlife (Verve, 1995)
 Wayne Escofferey – Firehouse 12 (Sunnyside, 2013)
 Terri Lyne Carrington – Mosaic 2 (Concord, 2015)

Movies
With Peter Gabriel
 Growing Up Live  (Real World, 2004)
 Still Growing Up Live  (Real World, 2005)
 “Al DiMeola Live at the Palladium” (Tomato Records, 1996)

References

External links
 Official site
 Trio of OZ
 Bio at Party of the Century
 Video interview at Allaboutjazz.com

Living people
New England Conservatory alumni
Berklee College of Music alumni
American jazz pianists
Women jazz pianists
Year of birth missing (living people)
Chesky Records artists
Columbia Records artists
GRP Records artists
21st-century American women pianists
21st-century American pianists
Vertú members
Steps Ahead members